Millers Creek is a stream in the U.S. state of Ohio.

Millers Creek has the name of the local Miller family.

References

Rivers of Butler County, Ohio
Rivers of Warren County, Ohio
Rivers of Ohio